Megacyon merriami, or Merriam's dog, was a prehistoric canid that lived in the early/middle Pleistocene (about 800-300 thousand years ago). Its fossilized remains have been found on the island of Java. Its scientific name means "Merriam's large dog".

Description
The fossil remains of this canid are incomplete, hence they do not provide an accurate reconstruction. The species appears to have been diverged from Xenocyon, along with the African wild dog, Sardinian dhole and Mececyon trinilensis, another extinct Javanese canid. The Merriam's dog had a set of strong, robust teeth. Its size probably exceeded that of the extant African wild dog.

References

 Schutt, 1973. Pleistozane Caniden (Carnivora, Mammalia) aus Java. Verhandelingen Koninklijke Akademie van der Wetenschappen (Series B), 76: 446–71.
 Lyras G.A., Van der Geer A.A.E., Rook L., 2010. Body size of insular carnivores: evidence from the fossil record. Journal of Biogeography, 37 (6): 1007–21.

Extinct animals of Indonesia
Pleistocene carnivorans
Prehistoric canines